Othelais is a genus of beetles in the family Cerambycidae, containing the following species:

 Othelais affinis Breuning, 1939
 Othelais flavovariegata Breuning, 1939
 Othelais histrio (Pascoe, 1859)
 Othelais irrorata (MacLeay, 1885)
 Othelais subtessalata Breuning, 1960
 Othelais tesselata (Pascoe, 1866)
 Othelais transversefasciata Breuning, 1953

References

Acanthocinini